Sar Kahnan (also Romanized as Sar Kahnān) is a village in Bikah Rural District, Bikah District, Rudan County, Hormozgan Province, Iran. At the 2006 census, its population was 22, in 5 families.

References 

Populated places in Rudan County